Konstantin Vitalyevich Kuchayev (born 18 March 1998) is a Russian professional footballer who plays as a right winger or attacking midfielder for CSKA Moscow.

Club career

CSKA Moscow
Kuchayev began his career with a football school in his hometown of Ryazan at the age of 8. Six years later, he joined Master-Saturn Yegoryevsk and moved to Moscow Oblast in 2012. While playing there, Kuchayev was spotted by CSKA Moscow scout Andrey Movsisyan and joined for the club in 2015.

Kuchayev made his senior debut with CSKA on 2 April 2017, in a 2–1 Russian Premier League win over Krylia Sovetov Samara. Having established himself in the team the following season, on 27 September 2017, Kuchayev scored his first goal for the club, coming on as a substitute to score CSKA's only goal in a 1–4 loss to Manchester United in the UEFA Champions League group stage. 

On 6 May 2017, Kuchayev tore his cruciate ligament in his left knee during a 6–0 home win over Arsenal Tula, keeping him out for six months. He missed the first half of 2018–19 season and returned to the team on 23 November as a substitute in a 2–0 away win against Akhmat Grozny. Kuchayev also missed the remainder of that season due to a meniscus injury he picked up in February 2019.

On 8 August 2020, Kuchayev scored his first goal in the Russian Premier League on the first day of the season in a 2–0 win over Khimki. He also scored in the following match, helping CSKA to a 2–1 win against Tambov at VEB Arena. Four goals in six appearances in August 2020 won Kuchayev the Russian Premier League Player of the Month award.

Rubin Kazan loan
On 26 January 2022, he joined Rubin Kazan on loan until the end of the 2021–22 season, with an option to purchase. Before the loan was agreed upon, Kuchayev extended his contract with CSKA until the end of the 2023–24 season. Rubin did not exercise the purchase option.

International career
Having represented Russia at various youth levels, Kuchayev scored two goals in nine matches during the 2021 UEFA European U-21 Championship qualifying, helping his team reach for the final tournament. On 15 March 2021, he was called up to the 23-man squad for the group stage of the tournament; however, five days later, he was ruled out due to a muscle injury.

On 2 November 2020, Kuchayev was named in Stanislav Cherchesov's Russia squad for the friendly match against Moldova and the UEFA Nations League fixtures against Turkey and Serbia. On 12 November 2020, Kuchayev made his senior national team debut as a half-time substitute in a 0–0 draw against Moldova.

Personal life
Kuchayev is in a relationship with a former figure skater Elena Radionova. They were engaged in late 2022.

Career statistics

Club

International

Honours
Individual
 Russian Premier League Player of the Month: August 2020

References

External links
 

1998 births
Living people
Sportspeople from Ryazan
Russian footballers
Russia youth international footballers
Russia under-21 international footballers
Russia international footballers
PFC CSKA Moscow players
FC Rubin Kazan players
Russian Premier League players
Association football midfielders